Samson Olanrewaju Akinyoola (born 3 March 2000) is a Beninese footballer who plays as a forward for Egyptian Egyptian Premier League club Zamalek.

Club career

FK Senica
Akinyoola made his Fortuna Liga debut for Senica against DAC Dunajská Streda on 14 September 2019.

In 2021 he goes to Caracas.

International career
Akinyoola represented Benin at the 2019 Africa U-20 Cup of Nations qualification.

Personal life
Akinyoola also holds Nigerian citizenship.

References

External links
 FK Senica official club profile 
 Futbalnet profile 
 
 

2000 births
Living people
People from Porto-Novo
Nigerian footballers
Nigerian expatriate footballers
Beninese footballers
Association football forwards
FK Senica players
Caracas FC players
Slovak Super Liga players
Venezuelan Primera División players
Benin under-20 international footballers
Beninese people of Nigerian descent
Beninese expatriate footballers
Beninese expatriate sportspeople in Slovakia
Expatriate footballers in Slovakia
Beninese expatriate sportspeople in Venezuela
Expatriate footballers in Venezuela
Citizens of Nigeria through descent
Nigerian expatriate sportspeople in Slovakia
Nigerian expatriate sportspeople in Venezuela
Beninese expatriate sportspeople in Egypt
Nigerian expatriate sportspeople in Egypt
Expatriate footballers in Egypt
Zamalek SC players